The 1980 Plesetsk launch pad disaster was the explosion of a Vostok-2M rocket carrying a Tselina-D satellite during fueling at Site 43 of the Plesetsk Cosmodrome in Mirny at 19:01 local time (16:01 GMT) on 18 March 1980, two hours and fifteen minutes before the intended launch time. 44 people were killed in the initial fire and four more soon died in the hospital from burns.

Sequence of events 
On 17 March the rocket was installed at the launch site. Various preliminary tests conducted before the fueling went as expected and without problem. The launch of the rocket was scheduled to take place at 21:16 on 18 March. Several hours before the intended launch, the tanks were filled with kerosene at 19:00 and preceded by the addition of liquid oxygen and liquid nitrogen to side tanks. After the addition of hydrogen peroxide was completed, a huge explosion at the site was witnessed at 19:01 MSK; 44 people in the area were killed instantly and another 43 required hospitalization for burns, four of whom later died while in the hospital. Many of the survivors suffered severe burns and lung damage. Over 80% of surviving eyewitnesses to the disaster reported that the first explosion originated from Block E of the rocket and was followed by multiple secondary explosions. The 300 tons of fuel destroyed the launch pad and surrounding area.

Aftermath

Initial investigation 
The official investigation responsible for determining the cause of the disaster headed by Leonid Smirnov assigned blame to the crew that was killed at the site of the fire by specifically stating the official cause as "explosion (inflammation) of material soaked in liquid oxygen as a result of unauthorized actions of one of the members of the ground crew". However, less than a year later, on 23 July 1981 after a second disaster of the same cause was narrowly avoided, it was discovered that a design flaw in the fuel filters of the rocket were likely the cause of the 1980 disaster, although it was impossible to confirm which type of filters were used in the rocket that exploded. The catalytically active lead solder on the filters would cause an explosion upon contact with hydrogen peroxide.

Cover-up 
The disaster was not reported in Soviet media at the time and only reached western media outlets in 1989 upon declassification. Pravda reported that the launch of the rocket was a success and did not say anything about the explosion.

Footnotes

References

March 1980 events in Europe
1980 disasters in the Soviet Union
Explosions in 1980
Vostok program
1980 in the Soviet Union
Space accidents and incidents in the Soviet Union
Soviet cover-ups
Disasters in the Soviet Union